Hans Peter Christian Møller (1810–1845) was a Danish malacologist and Inspector of North Greenland.

He studied at the Sorø Academy, where he studied theology and zoology. He later became a lieutenant in the Royal Danish Navy and traveled to Greenland to pursue his passion for malacology. While there, he wrote the Index Molluscorum Grönlandiae, which described all of the mollusks native to Greenland.

From 1843 to 1845 he served as Inspector of Colonies and Whaling in North Greenland before his untimely death in Rome at the age of 34.

Møller's sister Sophie married Christian Søren Marcus Olrik, who later also served as inspector.

See also
 List of inspectors of Greenland

References 

1810 births
1845 deaths
Danish malacologists
Danish zoologists
Inspectors of Greenland
19th-century Danish people
History of the Arctic